Asim Vokshi (1909–1937) was an Albanian Kosovar from Gjakova, Kosovo Vilayet, Ottoman Empire, and studied at a military academy in Italy.

He served as a staff officer in the Garibaldi Battalion of the XII International Brigade during the Spanish Civil War.

He is buried in the Cemetery of the Martyrs, Shkodër, Albania.

References

Further reading 

1909 births
1937 deaths
Military personnel from Gjakova
Kosovo Albanians
Albanian people of the Spanish Civil War
International Brigades personnel
Heroes of Albania